This list of shopping malls in Slovakia is a list of shopping malls in Slovakia, sorted by city.

 
Slovakia
Shopping malls